An isle is an island, land surrounded by water. The term is very common in British English. However, there is no clear agreement on what makes an island an isle or its difference, so they are considered synonyms.

Isle may refer to:

Geography
 Isle (river), a river in France
 Isle, Haute-Vienne, a commune of the Haute-Vienne département in France
 Isle, Minnesota, a small city in the United States
 River Isle, a river in England

Arts, entertainment, and media
 Interdisciplinary Studies in Literature and Environment (or ISLE), a journal published by Oxford University Press for the Association for the Study of Literature and Environment
The Isle, 2017 film with Conleth Hill
 The Isle, a 2000 South Korean film directed by Kim Ki-duk
 Isle (album)

Other uses
 International Society for the Linguistics of English (ISLE), a learned society of linguists

See also
 Aisle, a space for walking, e.g., in a church, classroom, theatre, supermarket, etc.
 Isles (disambiguation)